Rumiana Ruseva Jeleva (born 18 April 1969) was Bulgaria's minister of foreign affairs (July 2009 – January 2010), the third woman to hold this office after Irina Bokova and Nadezhda Mihailova. Jeleva was a key figure in the "GERB" political party which won the 2009 parliamentary elections. From 2007 to 2009 she served as Member of the European Parliament (MEP) and headed the Bulgarian delegation in the EPP Group. She was nominated by Prime Minister Boyko Borisov as Commissioner in the "Barroso II Commission" and was affiliated with the European People's Party (EPP). However, an article in the German newspaper Die Welt accused her husband of links with the Russian mafia.

Jeleva holds a B.A. in sociology from the University of Sofia (1995) and a PhD in sociology from Otto von Guericke University of Magdeburg (2003).

Pronunciation 
According to the current official standards for the Romanization of Bulgarian, her name should be transliterated as "Zheleva". Because of this confusion, some people erroneously pronounce the name with a y-sound, .

Failure in EC hearings and end of political career 
Jeleva was Bulgaria's nominee for European Commissioner for International Cooperation, Humanitarian Aid and Crisis Response. During her January 2010 confirmation hearing, she repeatedly failed to answer questions regarding allegations over her financial interests. She also failed to demonstrate sufficient competence in the areas she was to oversee. Her defensive and seemingly arrogant attitude and her poor language skills further jeopardized her candidacy. Facing a storm of disapproval at home, on 19 January 2010, Jeleva sent a letter of resignation to Bulgarian Prime Minister Boyko Borisov, stepping down as both commissioner-designate and Minister of Foreign Affairs, and putting an end to her political career. She was replaced as commissioner-designate by Kristalina Georgieva and as Minister of Foreign Affairs by Nickolay Mladenov.

See also
List of foreign ministers in 2010 
 Foreign relations of Bulgaria
List of Bulgarians

References

External links

 

1969 births
21st-century Bulgarian women politicians
21st-century Bulgarian politicians
Female foreign ministers
Women MEPs for Bulgaria
Foreign ministers of Bulgaria
GERB MEPs
GERB politicians
Living people
MEPs for Bulgaria 2007–2009
MEPs for Bulgaria 2009–2014
Women government ministers of Bulgaria
Bulgarian women diplomats